Peter Atherton (born 6 April 1970) is an English football coach and former professional footballer who is assistant manager of Bolton Wanderers.

As a player, he was a defender who notably played in the Premier League for Coventry City, Sheffield Wednesday and Bradford City. He also played in the Football League for Wigan Athletic and Birmingham City before finishing his career with non-league Halifax Town. He was capped once at England U21 level.

Since retirement he has worked as assistant manager of Halifax Town before returning to Wigan Athletic as a youth team coach. He was appointed assistant manager of Barrow and later followed manager Ian Evatt to Bolton Wanderers.

Early life
Atherton was born in Wigan, Lancashire.

Playing career 
Most famous for captaining Sheffield Wednesday, Atherton started his career at hometown club Wigan Athletic as a trainee and spent three years there before attracting the attention of Coventry City. Atherton was lured away from Wednesday by Bradford City after relegation on the Bosman ruling where he also spent a spell on loan at Birmingham City. Birmingham reached the League Cup final, however, Atherton was unable to play as he was cup-tied. After being released by Bradford on a free transfer he finished his career at Halifax Town, where injury forced him to retire from professional football after playing only 14 games for the club, but came out of retirement because of Halifax's injury crisis and was named as a substitute for their home game against Grays Athletic on 16 October 2007.

Coaching career 
In June 2007, Atherton was appointed assistant manager of Halifax Town, replacing Wayne Jacobs. He had previously been coaching in Wigan Athletic's youth set-up.

He also played for Sheffield Wednesday in their 2006 Masters Football campaign, and Wigan Athletic in 2007.

He became assistant manager at Barrow in July 2018.

On 1 July 2020, he was appointed as the assistant head coach of Bolton Wanderers, following Barrow head coach Ian Evatt to the University of Bolton Stadium. After the departure of Director of football Tobias Phoenix on 11 December Atherton's role was changed from Assistant head coach to assistant manager.

Honours
Individual
PFA Team of the Year: 1990–91 Third Division

References

External links 

1970 births
Living people
English footballers
England under-21 international footballers
Wigan Athletic F.C. players
Coventry City F.C. players
Sheffield Wednesday F.C. players
Bradford City A.F.C. players
Birmingham City F.C. players
Halifax Town A.F.C. players
Footballers from Wigan
Association football defenders
Association football midfielders
Premier League players
English Football League players
National League (English football) players
Association football utility players
Bradford City A.F.C. managers
Wigan Athletic F.C. non-playing staff
Barrow A.F.C. non-playing staff
English football managers
Halifax Town A.F.C. non-playing staff
Bolton Wanderers F.C. non-playing staff